Washington Rodríguez may refer to:

 Washington Rodríguez (boxer) (1944–2014), Uruguayan boxer
 Washington Rodríguez (footballer) (born 1970), Uruguayan footballer

See also
 Washington Rodrigues (born 1936), Brazilian radio sports broadcaster